Straight from the Heart is a 1935 American drama film directed by Scott R. Beal and starring Mary Astor, Roger Pryor, and Juanita Quigley.

Partial cast
 Mary Astor as Marian Henshaw  
 Roger Pryor as Andy MacLean  
 Juanita Quigley as Maggie Haines  
 Carol Coombe as Mrs. Haines  
 Andy Devine as Edwards  
 Henry Armetta as Ice Cream Man  
 Grant Mitchell as Austin  
 Virginia Hammond as Mrs. Austin  
 Robert McWade as Boss Tim Reglan  
 Doris Lloyd as Miss Carter  
 Hilda Vaughn as Miss Nellie  
 Louise Carter as Mother in Breadline  
 Willard Robertson as District Attorney  
 Douglas Fowley as Speed Spelvin  
 Clara Blandick as Mrs. Anderson

References

Bibliography
 Lowe, Denise. An Encyclopedic Dictionary of Women in Early American Films: 1895-1930. Routledge, 2014.

External links

1935 films
American drama films
1935 drama films
American black-and-white films
Films produced by B. F. Zeidman
Films directed by Scott R. Beal
1930s English-language films
1930s American films